This was the first edition of the tournament.

Robert Galloway and Hans Hach Verdugo won the title after defeating Nicolás Barrientos and Alejandro Gómez 4–6, 6–4, [10–8] in the final.

Seeds

Draw

References

External links
 Main draw

Ann Arbor Challenger - Doubles
Ann Arbor Challenger